EPSS can refer to:
Electronic performance support systems
Enhanced Polyphonic Sample Synthesizer, see List of audio trackers
Experimental Packet Switching System, see Packet switched network
Electronic Procurement Solicitation System (ePSS)
European Payment System Services, see Eurocard (payment card)